Risto Duganov (born May 19, 1975) is a former Macedonian professional basketball Small forward who played for Žito Vardar, Nemetali Ogražden, Kumanovo and Crn Drim.

References

External links
 Eurobasket Profile
 FIBA Profile

1975 births
Living people
Macedonian men's basketball players
Small forwards
Place of birth missing (living people)